Dust of Life, also known in Vietnamese as Bui Doi, is a 2009 film by director Le-Van Kiet, who also wrote the screenplay.

Plot
Since 1975 millions of Vietnamese boat people have fled for freedom. By 1993 more than half who survived the exodus resided in California. The film portrays the coming of age story of abandoned kids growing up in the new Vietnamese enclave of Orange County, California in the early 1990s, based on true events.

Cast
Devon Duy Nguyen—Johnny
Thu-Mai Tran—Mai
England DuVan—Rascal
Mai Khanh—Mai’s Mother
Linh Le—Quynh
Liem Michael Doan—Father Michael
Dang Hung Son—Mai's father

Festivals
The film also showed at the Vietnamese International Film Festival in 2011

External links
 Coco Paris LLC site about the film

2009 films